Wyman J. Roberts (September 27, 1915 – December 1, 1987) was an American professional basketball player. He played in the National Basketball League for the Dayton Metropolitans in just two games during the 1937–38 season and averaged 3.0 points per game. In his post-basketball life, Roberts worked as a construction worker in Dayton, Ohio.

References

1915 births
1987 deaths
American men's basketball players
Basketball players from Columbus, Ohio
Basketball players from Dayton, Ohio
Dayton Metropolitans players
Forwards (basketball)